Batticaloa District ( Maṭṭakkaḷappu Māvaṭṭam;  maḍakalapūva distrikkaya) is one of the 25 districts of Sri Lanka, the second level administrative division of the country. The district is administered by a District Secretariat headed by a District Secretary (previously known as a Government Agent) appointed by the central government of Sri Lanka. The capital of the district is the city of Batticaloa. Ampara District was carved out of the southern part of Batticaloa District in April 1961.

Geography
Batticaloa District is located in the east of Sri Lanka in the Eastern Province.

Administrative units
Batticaloa District is divided into 14 Divisional Secretary's Division (DS Divisions), each headed by a Divisional Secretary (previously known as an Assistant Government Agent). The DS Divisions are further sub-divided into 346 Grama Niladhari Divisions (GN Divisions).

Demographics

Population
Batticaloa District's population was 525,142 in 2012. The population of the district mostly Sri Lankan Tamil.

The population of the district, like the rest of the east and north, was affected by the civil war. The war killed an estimated 100,000 people. Several hundred thousand Sri Lankan Tamils, possibly as much as one million, emigrated to the West during the war. Many Sri Lankan Tamils also moved to the relative safety of the capital Colombo. The war also caused many people from all ethnic and religious groups who lived in the district to flee to other parts of Sri Lanka, though most of them have returned to the district since the end of the civil war.

Ethnicity

Religion

Politics and government

Local government
Batticaloa District has 12 local authorities of which one is a Municipal Council, two are Urban Councils and the remaining nine are Divisional Councils (Pradesha Sabhai or Pradeshiya Sabha).

Notes

References

External links

 Batticaloa District Secretariat

 
Districts of Sri Lanka